Shane William Byrne (born 25 April 1993) is an Irish professional footballer who usually plays as a central midfielder and plays for Kidderminster Harriers. Byrne has also represented the Republic of Ireland U17 and Republic of Ireland U19 teams.

Career

Leicester City
Byrne started his career at Dublin and was part of the youth team that reached the quarter finals of the FA Youth Cup in the 2010–11 season. On the international transfer deadline day in 2011 Byrne withdrew from the Republic of Ireland U19 squad in order to move on loan to Bury.

Bury (loan)
In August 2011 Byrne moved on loan to Bury for an initial 3 months. Byrne made his professional début for the club against Sheffield United on 3 September 2011. In October he had his loan extended. He made his F.A. Cup debut on 12 November in a 2–0 defeat to Crawley Town. On 28 December Byrne signed the loan papers to extend his loan at Bury until the end of January. His time at Bury was curtailed after picking up an ankle injury at Colchester United on 10 December 2011.

Bury confirmed on 14 August 2013 that Byrne had been released from his contract by mutual consent.

Bray Wanderers
In 2014 Byrne announced that he was released from his contract by mutual consent. A few weeks later it was announced that he had returned to Ireland to join an Irish club Bray Wanderers for an undisclosed fee.

Corby Town
Byrne joined Corby Town in August 2014. He made his Corby Town debut in a pre-season friendly victory over a Nottingham Forest XI, however was made to wait for international clearance before his maiden competitive outing against Cirencester Town.

Nuneaton Town
On 23 June 2015 Byrne joined Nuneaton Town. Due to contractual issues, Byrne left the left the club at the end of the 2015-2016 season.

Brackley Town

He moved to Brackley Town for the 2016–17 season. On 20 May 2018 he won the Fa trophy at Wembley.

Boston United
On 20 June 2021 it was reported that Byrne had signed for Boston United

Kidderminster Harriers
On 4 July 2022, Byrne joined Kidderminster Harriers having defeated his new club the previous season in the play-offs.

International career

Republic of Ireland U17
Byrne has represented the Republic of Ireland at U-17 on two occasions.

Republic of Ireland U19
On 10 February 2011 he made his debut for the Republic of Ireland national under-19 football team against Croatia. Byrne was called up by the U19's to face a double header against Slovenia in October 2011 but withdrew in order to extend his loan at Bury.

Career statistics

Honours
Brackley Town
FA Trophy: 2017–18

References

External links

1993 births
Living people
Republic of Ireland association footballers
Association football midfielders
Leicester City F.C. players
Bury F.C. players
Bray Wanderers F.C. players
Corby Town F.C. players
Nuneaton Borough F.C. players
Brackley Town F.C. players
Boston United F.C. players
Kidderminster Harriers F.C. players
English Football League players
National League (English football) players
Republic of Ireland youth international footballers